The 2001 World Weightlifting Championships were held in Antalya, Turkey from November 4 to November 11. The men's competition in the heavyweight (105 kg) division was staged on 10 November 2001.

Medalists

Records

Results

New records

References
Weightlifting World Championships Seniors Statistics, Page 36 

2001 World Weightlifting Championships